Events in the year 2022 in Bangladesh.

Incumbents

Events

January-March 
 21 January – The country closes schools, universities, and other equivalent educational institutions until February 6 and bans social, political, religious, and state events gathered more than 100 people amid an alarming spread of the SARS-CoV-2 Omicron variant.

April-June 
 19 April - Students of Dhaka College violently clash with poor hard working shop keepers of New Market area, in the process setting shops on fire and causing severe traffic congestions in Dhaka City. Police brought the situation under control by late afternoon.
 4-7 June - 2022 Sitakunda fire.
 17 June - Narayanganj EPZ fire.
 17-20 June - Massive flooding hits northeastern districts of Bangladesh leaving millions stranded.
 25 June - The largest bridge in the country, the Padma Bridge, was inaugurated.

July-September 
 29 July - Sajid Asbat Khandaker and Sourodip Paul of BRAC University won the World Universities Debating Championship on behalf of Bangladesh.
 22–30 September - 2022 Eden College Scandal

October-December 
 20 October - Bangladesh authorities issue travel ban in Bandarban district amidst security concerns in the region.
 25 October - Cyclone Sitrang
 19 November - Professor MA Hannan, a Bangladeshi scientist is listed among the world"s most influential scientists.
 10 December: The prestigious three match ODI Cricket series between Bangladesh and India ends with Bangladesh securing a 2-1 series win over India, despite India's dominating performance in the final match. Bangladeshi player Mehidy Hasan Miraz is named the player of the series for his brilliant performance in the first two games.
 28 December: The Dhaka Metro Rail is inaugurated by Prime Minister Sheikh Hasina.

Deaths

January 
 19 January — Qazi Anwar Hussain, writer and litterateur, creator of the Masud Rana character (b. 1936)

February 

 20 February — Quazi Rosy, poet and former member of parliament (b. 1949)

March 
 19 May — Abdul Gaffar Chowdhury, writer, journalist, columnist, political analyst and poet (b. 1934)

April

May

June

July 
 8 July – Sharmili Ahmed, actress (b. 1947)
14 July – Kazi Ebadul Haque, justice and language movement veteran (b. 1936)

August

September

October 

 9 October – Samarjit Roy Chowdhury, artist, painter and teacher (b. 1937)

November

December

References 

 
Bangladesh
Bangladesh
2020s in Bangladesh
Years of the 21st century in Bangladesh